Sharon Lin (born November 14, 1998) is a Chinese-American high school entrepreneur. She was recognized by the White House as a Champion of Change  for her work in developing computer science programs for marginalized girls.

References

External links
White House Champions of Change

Living people
1998 births
Stuyvesant High School alumni
People from Queens, New York
American computer businesspeople
Businesspeople in information technology
American company founders
American women company founders
21st-century American women